"Patti", "Pattie", or "Patty" is a feminine given name, and/or a surname. 

As a given name, it can be a short form or diminutive of Patricia, meaning 'noble woman'(as derived from Latin).

List of people

Given name
 Patti Austin (born 1950), American R&B, pop and jazz singer
 Patti Catalano (born 1953), American long-distance runner 
 Patti Davis (born 1952), American actress and author
 Patti Deutsch (born 1945), American voice artist and comedic actress
 Patti Flynn (1937–2020), jazz singer, author, radio actress, model and social activist
 Patti Grace Smith (1947–2016), United States Federal Aviation Administration (FAA) official
 Patti Harrison (born 1945), American actress and comedian
 Patti Karr (1932–2020), American actress, dancer, and singer 
 Patti LaBelle (born 1944), American singer, author, actress, and entrepreneur
 Patti LuPone (born 1949), American actress and singer
 Patti Mayor (born Martha Ann Mayor; 1872–1962), English artist
 Patti Miller ((born 1954), Australian writer
 Patti Page (1927–2013), American singer of traditional pop music
 Patti Russo (born 1964), American singer, songwriter, and actress
 Patti Scialfa (born 1953), American singer-songwriter and guitarist
 Patti Smith (born 1946), American singer-songwriter, poet, and visual artist 
 Patti Stanger (born 1961), American businesswoman and reality television personality
 Patti Starr (born c. 1943), Canadian administrator and novelist
 Patti Yasutake, American film and television actress

Surname
 Adelina Patti (1843–1919), Italian-French opera singer
 Cathy Gentile-Patti, American para-alpine skier
 Ercole Patti (1903–1976), Italian author, dramatist, screenwriter and journalist

See also
 Pattie (disambiguation), includes list of people with the name
 Patty (given name)
 Patty (surname)
 Patti (disambiguation)
 Piatti (disambiguation)